Marcelle Auclair (11 November 1899 – 6 June 1983) was a French novelist, biographer, journalist and poet. She published biographies of several important historical figures, translated major historical/literary documents into French from Spanish, and wrote a novel. She also published an autobiographical work, two books on popular psychology, a religious book for children, a book on artistic images of Jesus. Several of her books were translated into English. She was co-founder with Jean Prouvost of the fashion magazine Marie Claire.

Biography
Marcelle Auclair was born 11 November 1899 in Montluçon, central France, and died in Paris on 6 June 1984.<ref
  name=rougeron05>"AUCLAlR (Marcelle), née à Montluçon le 11 novembre 1899; fille du précédent.... Marcelle Auclair a publié des biographies: La Vie de Sainte Thérèse d'Avila (1950), La Vie de Jean Jaurès (1954), ... Décédée à Paris le 6 juin 1983" (p. 265). In:  (285 pages).</ref>
She was the daughter of the architect Victor Auclair and his wife Eugénie Rateau.
She spent part of her childhood and youth in Chile, where her father settled in 1906 to participate in the country's reconstruction after a devastating earthquake. She did her schooling in Santiago (Chile), where she also learned Spanish and English while reading French authors.

Returning to France in 1923, she married the writer Jean Prévost (m. April 28, 1926), with whom she had three children (Michel, Françoise, and Alain).<ref
   name=merwin05></ref> 
They divorced in 1938.

Literary and journalistic contributions

Auclair published biographies of two Roman Catholic saints, Teresa of Avila (1950) and Bernadette of Lourdes (1957). She also published biographies of Spanish poet and playwright Federico García Lorca, whom she knew personally (1968), and of the early 20th century pro-peace French socialist Jean Jaurès (1954).

Auclair's first original publication was Transparence, a book of original poetry in Spanish, published when she was 20 years old, and living in Santiago, Chile.
Another early publication, in French, was Auclair's novel, Toya, published in 1927.

In 1937, Auclair and Jean Prouvost founded the fashion magazine Marie Claire.<ref
    name=touret05>"Avec Jean Prouvost, Marcelle Auclair fonda « Marie-Claire » magazine féminin inspiré des magazines américains.... Décédée à Paris le 6 juin 1983, elle est inhumée dans l'Essonne auprès de son père" (p. 318). In:  (351 pages).</ref><ref
    name=leenaerts10>"Lancé por Jean Prouvost en 1937, le principal acteur de ce renouvellement porte le (prè)nom Marie Claire. Placèe sous la direction de Marcelle Auclair et de Pierre Bost, cette publication qui recourt volontiers au ton de la confidence, s’adresse à l’ensemble des femmes et non plu à la seule bourgeoisie." (p. 65). In:  (403 pages).</ref>
Auclair wrote many articles for Marie Claire, extending over a period of several years. In A History of Private Life (1991),<ref
   name=prost91>Antoine Prost (1991). "Public and Private Spheres in France". In: . Translation of Histoire de la privée. Paris: Éditions du Seuil, 1987.</ref> writing about Auclair's time as a columnist for the magazine Marie Claire, Antoine Prost stated that 

In the 1950s, Auclair published two popular books on how to lead a happy life, Le bonheur est en vous (1951) and La Pratique du bonheur (1956).

In 1953, Auclair published a French-language children's book about the life of Jesus. 
The book was republished in English translation in both the US
and the UK.

Auclair's translation of the complete works of Teresa of Avila from Spanish to French was first published in 1964.

At age 78, five years before her death, Auclair published an autobiographical work with her daughter, actress Françoise Prévost.

In European Literary Heritage,
Auclair was described as "particularly attached to moral issues and the situation of women in the contemporary world [particulièrement attachée aux problèmes moraux et à la situation de la femme dans le monde contemporain]."

Selected works

Translated into English
(457 pages)
French original:  (493 pages)
German translation:  (491 pages)

 (204 pages)
French original:  (284 pages)

 (139 pages)
French original:  (144 pages)

French, untranslated into English
 (218 pages)
 (673 pages)
 (200 pages)
 (477 pages)
Spanish translation:  (411 pages). Includes excerpts from García Lorca's works.
 (429 pages)

Children's books
 (126 pages)
English edition (US):  (93 pages). Translation of La bonne nouvelle annoncee aux enfants
English edition (UK):  (125 pages)

References

External links
Photograph and Videos of Marcelle Auclaire (at :fr:Babelio)

1899 births
1983 deaths
20th-century French essayists
20th-century French journalists
French women journalists
20th-century French novelists
People from Montluçon
20th-century French women writers